Monstera barrieri is a flowering plant of the genus Monstera and family Araceae.

Distribution 
It is native to France (French Guiana).

Description 
It is a hemiepiphyte up to 10 meters in trees. Adult plants have an asymmetrical stem with diameter up to 2 cm internodes are shorter than they are broad, Petioles are 18–41 cm long. Blades are 36–58 cm long, and  31–37 cm wide.

References 

barrieri